Ben Robb (born 24 October 1988) is a New Zealand professional darts player who plays in the events of Professional Darts Corporation (PDC).

Career
Robb made his television debut in the 2018 Auckland Darts Masters, but lost to Simon Whitlock of Australia.

Robb subsequently competed in the 2019 Brisbane Darts Masters, losing in the first round to Michael van Gerwen 6–0.

In the 2019 New Zealand Darts Masters, he beat Whitlock 6–4 before losing to Rob Cross in the quarter-finals. In January 2022 Robb participated in the PDC Qualifying School without success.

World Championship results

PDC
 2020: First round (lost to Ron Meulenkamp 0–3) 
 2022: First round (lost to Rusty-Jake Rodriguez 1–3)
 2023: First round (lost to Mickey Mansell 1–3)

WDF
 2023:

References

External links

1988 births
Living people
New Zealand darts players
Professional Darts Corporation associate players
People from Rangiora
Sportspeople from Canterbury, New Zealand